Hidradenoma refers to a benign adnexal tumor of the apical sweat gland. These are 1–3 cm translucent blue cystic nodules. It usually presents as a single, small skin-colored lesion, and may be considered closely related to or a variant of poromas. Hidradenomas are often sub-classified based on subtle histologic differences, for example:

 Eccrine acrospiroma
 Clear-cell hidradenoma or acrospiroma
 Nodular hidradenoma or acrospiroma
 Solid-cystic hidradenoma

Discussion of sweat gland tumors can be difficult and confusing due to the complex classification and redundant terminology used to describe the same tumors. For example, acrospiroma and hidradenoma are synonymous, and sometimes the term acrospiroma is used to generally describe benign sweat gland tumors. In addition, a single lesion may contain a mixture of cell-types.  There has also been a change in understanding about how tumors that were previously believed to strictly derive from specific sweat gland types may, in fact, derive from both eccrine or apocrine glands.

Hidradenomas are by definition benign, with malignant transformation very rare. When tumors show malignant characteristics, they are known as hidradenocarcinoma.  Surgical excision is usually curative and local recurrences are rare, although malignant tumors may metastasize.

See also 

 Spiroma
 List of cutaneous conditions
 List of cutaneous neoplasms associated with systemic syndromes

References

External links 

Integumentary neoplasia
Epidermal nevi, neoplasms, and cysts